Rose Guitarinaal is a 2013 Indian romantic musical written and directed by Ranjan Pramod. The film features Richard Joy Thomas, Athmiya Rajan, Manu and Rejith Menon in lead roles, and was produced by Maha Subair under the banner of Varnachitra Big Screen in association with Colour Pencil Films. The film was released on 1 March 2013.

Plot
Thara, who is training to be an air hostess, hails from a middle-class family. Her small happy world comprises her father and the pet dog Tuttu. She also has a childhood friend whom she affectionately calls Appu. Appu takes her to and from work in his two wheeler. The story takes a twist when the CEO of her airline company, Shyam, takes an interest in her. Their new closeness annoys Appu and he begins moving away from her. How Tara deals with this emotional love triangle comprises the plot.

Cast
 Richard Joy Thomas as Shyam
 Athmiya Rajan as Thara
 Manu as Joe
 Rejith Menon as Binoy
 Jagadish as Thara's father
 Liimal G Padath as Arjun
 Nisha as Sherin
 Joy Mathew as Joe's father
 Thara Kalyan as Joe's mother
 Kiran Raj as Amar

Reception 
A critic from Rediff.com wrote that "Overall, Rose Guitarinaal is devoid of charm and offers nothing to entice the viewer".

References

External links
 

2010s Malayalam-language films
Films scored by Shahabaz Aman